The African Entertainment Awards USA (also referred to as AEAUSA), an annual event consisting of mostly music awards.

History
The event is composed of 30 categories (22 music & 8 non-music) and the 1st edition of the African Entertainment Awards was held on 31 October 2015, at the Mary Burch Theater Newark, New Jersey, with host; Comrade Fatso, and Hassan Oliver. The 5th AEAUSA Awards was held on October 19, 2019, at New Jersey Institute of Technology with co-host Eric Omondi, and Anita Fabiola, as it honors African excellence and its pioneers at the ceremony.

Ceremonies

Controversy
In 2020, Laycon won Best New Artist in all of Africa, and was celebrated by his fans on social media. In 2019, Eddy Kenzo won Best African Entertainer Of The Year, which was received with controversy criticizing the fairness of the award. In 2017, Yemi Alade won big, and left fans debating about her alleged rivalry with songwriter and actress Tiwa Savage, on "Who's Mama Africa".

Performering act(s)

Award categories
The following are the present categories:

Music categories

Best Male Artist
Best Female Artist
Best Hip Hop Artist
Hottest Group
Best Collaboration
Best Video
Entertainer of the Year
Best Gospel Artist
Best Local Dancer/Group
Best Promoter
Best Local DJ
Best Francophone Artist
Best Palop Male Artist
Best Palop Female Artist
Best Upcoming Artist
Single of the Year
Best Local Artist
Best Male Artist – Central/West Africa
Best Male Artist – East/South/North Africa
Best Female Artist – Central/West Africa
Best Female Artist – East/South/North Africa
Best Dancehall Artist

Other categories
Best African Talent/Artist Managers
Local Model of the Year
Fashion Designer of the Year (also known as Best Local Fashion Designer)
Best African Comedian
Best Host
Best Blogger/Influencer
Local Athlete of the Year
Community Award
Best video

African Entertainment Awards (Canada)
In 2011, the African Entertainment Awards (Canada) were founded by Nigerian Social Entrepreneur Kunle Adewale to recognize the African-Canadian entertainment industry. Despite the similarity in name, the two award ceremonies are unrelated.

References

Awards established in 2015
American music awards